Bulgaria participated in the ninth Winter Paralympics in Turin, Italy. 

Bulgaria entered three athletes in Nordic skiing; two males and one female.

Medalists

See also

2006 Winter Paralympics
Bulgaria at the 2006 Winter Olympics

External links
Torino 2006 Paralympic Games
International Paralympic Committee

2006
Nations at the 2006 Winter Paralympics
Winter Paralympics